Khairul Asyraf may refer to:
 Khairul Asyraf (footballer, born December 1994), Malaysian footballer for Penang
 Khairul Asyraf (footballer, born March 1994), Malaysian footballer for UiTM